Donna Vekić defeated Caroline Garcia in the final, 6–4, 3–6, 7–5 to win the women's singles tennis title at the 2023 Monterrey Open. It was her fourth career WTA Tour title. 

Leylah Fernandez was the two-time reigning champion, but chose not to participate this year.

Seeds

Draw

Finals

Top half

Bottom half

Qualifying

Seeds

Qualifiers

Lucky loser

Qualifying draw

First qualifier

Second qualifier

Third qualifier

Fourth qualifier

Fifth qualifier

Sixth qualifier

References

External links
Main draw
Qualifying draw

2023 1
Monterrey Open - Singles